The 1965 Copa Libertadores Finals was a football series between Argentine team Independiente and Uruguayan team Peñarol on 6 and 12 April of that same year. It was the sixth final of South America's most prestigious football competition, the Copa Libertadores.

After both teams won one match each, a playoff was played on 15 April, being won by Independiente by 4–1 at Estadio Nacional in Santiago de Chile. Therefore the Diablos Rojos won their 2nd Copa Libertadores title.

Qualified teams

Venues

Match details

First leg

Second leg

Playoff

References

1965
1
Club Atlético Independiente matches
Peñarol matches
1965 in Uruguayan football
1965 in Argentine football
April 1965 sports events in South America
Football in Avellaneda